Pedro Pinciroli Júnior (born 16 December 1943) is a Brazilian water polo player. He competed at the 1964 Summer Olympics and the 1968 Summer Olympics.

References

External links
 

1943 births
Living people
Brazilian male water polo players
Olympic water polo players of Brazil
Water polo players at the 1964 Summer Olympics
Water polo players at the 1968 Summer Olympics
Water polo players from São Paulo
20th-century Brazilian people